Milen Georgiev (Bulgarian: Милен Георгиев; born 7 May 1974) is a former Bulgarian professional footballer who played as a forward.

Honours
Chongqing Longxin
Chinese FA Cup: 2000

References

External links
Player Profile at National-Football-Teams.com

1974 births
Living people
Bulgarian footballers
Bulgaria international footballers
Association football forwards
Neftochimic Burgas players
Panionios F.C. players
PFC Spartak Varna players
FC Dynamo Saint Petersburg players
Lierse S.K. players
PFC Nesebar players
PFC Chernomorets Burgas players
First Professional Football League (Bulgaria) players
Super League Greece players
Belgian Pro League players
Expatriate footballers in China
Expatriate footballers in Greece
Expatriate footballers in Russia
Expatriate footballers in Belgium